Good Girl(s) may refer to:

Books
 The Good Girls: An Ordinary Killing, a 2021 narrative non-fiction book by Sonia Faleiro

Film and television
 The Good Girl, 2002 black comedy-drama film
 The Good Girl (2004 film), erotic short film
 The Good Girls (film), Mexican film
 The Good Girls, English title of the 1960 French film Les Bonnes Femmes
 Good Girl (film), 2005 French film
 "Good Girl", episode of the seventh season of Law & Order
 Good Girls (TV series), American comedy-drama television series
 Good Girl (TV series), Korean reality show musical

Illustrations and comics
Good girl art, illustrations with a strong emphasis on attractive females
Good Girls (comics), a comic book series

Music
The Good Girls (group), an R&B group

Albums
Good Girl (Jill Johnson album), a 2002 album by Swedish singer Jill Johnson
Good Girl (Sherman Chung album) (乖女仔)  2007

Songs
 "Good Girl" (Alexis Jordan song), 2011
 "Good Girl" (Carrie Underwood song), 2012
 "Good Girl" (Dustin Lynch song), 2018
 "Good Girl" (Hyuna song), 2020
"Good Girls", by The Ronettes, 1962
"Good Girls", by John Mellencamp from his 1976 album Chestnut Street Incident
"Good Girls", by Carl Craig from his 1995 album Dirty Laundry
"Good Girls", by Carl Craig from his 1996 album DJ-Kicks: Carl Craig
"Good Girls", by Charli XCX from her unreleased album XCX World
"Good Girl", by Chrisette Michele's from her 2007 album I Am
"Good Girls", by Tim McGraw from his 2009 album Southern Voice
 "Good Girls" (5 Seconds of Summer song), 2014
"Good Girls", by Crystal Fighters on the 2016 album Everything Is My Family
 "Good Girls" (Elle King song), 2016
"Good Girls", by CHVRCHES from their 2021 album Screen Violence

See also
Very Good Girls, 2013 drama film
Good Little Girls, 1971 French film
"Good Little Girls" (song), 2003 Blue County song
Good Girl Gone Bad (disambiguation)
Good Girls Don't (disambiguation)